The Nobel Prizes were established according to the will of the Swedish industrialist and inventor, Alfred Nobel and are awarded to individuals who have excelled in the fields of chemistry, physics, physiology or medicine, literature, economics and peace. Since 1903, 39 Swedes have been awarded the Nobel Prize where it originates. The latest winner, Svante Pääbo, was a recipient in the field of Medicine.

Laureates

Nominees

References

Sweden